Washington Academy is a private preparatory high school in East Machias, Maine. Founded in 1792, the Academy has an enrollment of 438 boarding and day students.

History 
In the beginning, classes were held in Machias at the Burnham Tavern and the Masonic Hall. It wasn’t until much later that the school got its own building. After deliberation between neighboring towns, the first school building was built in East Machias, opening its doors on September 8, 1823.

Today Washington Academy welcomes boys and girls, about 50% of each gender. It has over 350 day students and about 90 residential students- representing more than 20 surrounding communities. As of 2017, the school had 96 international students from 24 different countries.

Washington Academy completed construction of a new Health and Wellness Center, and improvements in athletic fields, classroom space, and digital infrastructure in 2011.

Notable alumni
 George S. Grimmer, lawyer
 Alexander Hamilton Handy, jurist
 George Harris, theologian
 Frederick A. Pike, politician
 James Savage, banker
 Alfred Stone, architect
 John C. Caldwell,soldier in the Battle of Gettysburg

References

External links
 Official website

Schools in Washington County, Maine
Educational institutions established in 1792
Private high schools in Maine
1792 establishments in Massachusetts
Machias, Maine